Distorsio ridens is a species of medium-sized sea snail, a marine gastropod mollusk in the family Personidae, the Distortio snails.

Description

Distribution

References

 Parth M. (2017). Seashells and Chinese snuff bottles. The collection Manfred Parth. München: Verlag Dr Friedrich Pfeil. 288 pp. . page(s): 157-162

External links
 Reeve L.A. (1844). Monograph of the genus Triton. In: Conchologia Iconica, vol. 2, pls 1-20 and unpaginated text. L. Reeve & Co., London
 Emerson W.K. & Piech B.J. (1992). Remarks on Distorsio constricta (Broderip, 1833) and related species in the eastern Pacific Ocean, with the description of a new species (Gastropoda: Personidae). The Veliger. 35(2): 105-116.

Personidae
Gastropods described in 1844